Alex Murray may refer to:

 Alex Murray (Australian footballer) (1885–1947), Australian rules footballer
 Alex Murray (footballer, born 1992), Guyanese football goalkeeper
 Alex Wharton (later Alex Murray, born 1939), British singer, producer and manager

See also
 Alexander Murray (disambiguation)